John Miller (born 1958 or 1959) was the Deputy Commissioner of Intelligence & Counterterrorism of the NYPD. He was the former Associate Deputy Director of National Intelligence for Analytic Transformation and Technology. Prior to that, he was an Assistant Director of Public Affairs for the Federal Bureau of Investigation (FBI), where he was the bureau's national spokesman. Miller is also a former ABC News reporter and anchorman, perhaps best known for conducting a May 1998 interview with Osama bin Laden in Afghanistan.

Miller was named a senior correspondent for CBS News on October 17, 2011. In this capacity, Miller reported for all CBS News platforms and broadcasts, including CBS This Morning and occasionally for 60 Minutes.

Background and personal life
Miller is the son of Lucinda and John J. Miller, a syndicated columnist and freelance writer whose range of roles included Hollywood gossip columnist, foreign correspondent, Broadway critic, crime investigator, and political pundit, "My dad wrote seven columns under six different names... Antonio from Rome. Pierre from Paris. Nigel from London," Miller has said. His father was also a close friend of Luciano crime family boss Frank Costello, whose wife, Lauretta, was Miller's godmother.

Raised in Montclair, New Jersey, Miller attended Montclair High School, where he developed his interest in news and reporting by taking photos for sale to newspapers and ditching school in order to go to press briefings.

In 2002, Miller married Emily  Altschul, daughter of banker and Goldman Sachs Group partner Arthur Goodhart Altschul Sr., a member of the Lehman family, and of botanist Siri von Reis. Miller's brother-in-law, Arthur Altschul, Jr., worked for Goldman Sachs and Morgan Stanley before becoming chairman of Medicis Pharmaceuticals Corporation. His sister-in-law is former MTV VJ, Serena Altschul.

Career 
Miller began work as a journalist in 1983 for WNEW, a local New York City television station. From 1985 to 1994, he worked as an investigative journalist for WNBC, another local New York television station. During his tenure at the station, he conducted several interviews with John Gotti.

From 1994 to 1995, he served as the Deputy Commissioner of Public Information (chief spokesman) for the New York City Police Department, a move that some of his colleagues considered "going over to the dark side." He was hired at the request of then Commissioner William Bratton.

Miller worked as an ABC News correspondent beginning in 1995. Using an al-Qaeda agent in London as an intermediary, Miller was able to make contact with Mohammed Atef to request an interview with Osama bin Laden in May 1998. Miller was instructed to travel to Islamabad, Pakistan, and was escorted over the Afghanistan-Pakistan border to meet bin Laden in a camp near Kandahar. He asked bin Laden questions that were translated into Arabic by an al-Qaeda translator, but bin Laden's answers were not translated, so Miller was not immediately aware of what bin Laden was saying during the interview.

During his tenure at ABC, Miller also covered the September 11, 2001 attacks, where he sat alongside Peter Jennings for the duration of the day listening in to radio conversations from the FBI, FDNY and NYPD, informing Jennings and viewers of their content.

In January 2002, Miller took the post of co-anchor with Barbara Walters of the ABC News program, 20/20.

In January 2003, he left ABC News to rejoin Bratton, who by then was at the Los Angeles Police Department. Miller served as the police department's Bureau Chief for the Counter-Terrorism and Criminal Intelligence Bureau, which included the Major Crimes Division, and the Emergency Services Division and the Special Investigations Section (SIS). While there, Miller launched Project Archangel which included the Automated Critical Asset Management System (ACAMS), among other platforms, and which has been adopted by other cities and states for ongoing risk-assessment of potential terrorist targets. Miller was also one of the original designers of the Los Angeles Joint Regional Intelligence Center (JRIC), which combines intelligence and analysis for the LAPD, LA Sheriff, and the FBI.

In September 2005, Miller became the Assistant Director for Public Affairs at the FBI in Washington, D.C. In this position, he was tasked with overseeing the FBI's internal and external communications, including relations with the news media and handling of fugitive publicity, community relations, and other communications support. Miller also established an Employee Communications Unit to build stronger internal communications to the bureau's 31,000 employees. Among his collateral duties was to serve on the Strategic Execution Team (SET) to establish performance measurement standards for intelligence operations across the FBI's 56 field offices. The system, adapted from the CompStat process used by major police departments, was overseen by then-FBI Director Robert Mueller.

In 2011, Miller left his position at the FBI to work as a senior correspondent for CBS News. In 2013, he reported in the "Inside the NSA" episode of 60 Minutes which was criticized for justifying the organization's spying on American citizens.

In December 2013, Miller announced that he would be resigning from CBS in order to take a position as the Deputy Commissioner for Intelligence & Counterterrorism with the NYPD. Miller rejoined William Bratton, who had earlier been announced as the new NYPD Commissioner by Mayor Bill de Blasio.

Awards and honors
Miller's journalistic awards include two Peabody Awards, a DuPont-Columbia Award, and nine Emmys.

Memberships and affiliations
He is a member of the International Association of Bomb Technicians and Investigators and the International Association of Chiefs of Police.

Miller is an instructor at the FBI's National Executive Institute, as well as the Leadership in Counterterrorism (LinCT) course and has attended training in organizational change at Harvard University's John F. Kennedy School of Government as well as the Kellogg School of Management at Northwestern University.

See also

 List of television reporters

References

External links

1950s births
Place of birth missing (living people)
20th-century United States government officials
ABC News personalities
American investigative journalists
American television news anchors
Emmy Award winners
Federal Bureau of Investigation executives
Harvard Kennedy School people
Living people
Los Angeles Police Department
Montclair High School (New Jersey) alumni
Deputy New York City Police Commissioners
New York (state) television reporters
Peabody Award winners
People from Montclair, New Jersey
Kellogg School of Management alumni
Lehman family